Kiltsa is a rural locality (a selo) in Mezensky District of Arkhangelsk Oblast, Russia.(

In 2016 Kiltsa was included in The Most Beautiful Villages in Russia.

References 

Rural localities in Mezensky District